Robert A. Rees (born November 17, 1935) is an American educator, scholar and poet. Beginning in 1998 he was director of education and humanities at the Institute of HeartMath in Boulder Creek, California. Currently, he is a visiting professor and director of Mormon studies at Graduate Theological Union in Berkeley.

Biography
Rees, a graduate of Long Beach Woodrow Wilson High School, received his B.A. from Brigham Young University and  M.A. and PhD from the University of Wisconsin–Madison.  For twenty-five years he taught at University of California, Los Angeles, where he also served as assistant dean of fine arts, director of continuing education in the arts and humanities, and director of studies for three UCLA programs in England: at Cambridge University and at London's Royal College of Art and Royal College of Music. He was the editor of Dialogue: A Journal of Mormon Thought from 1970 to 1976. Taking early retirement from UCLA in 1992, Rees was a visiting professor at Vytautas Magnus University in Kaunas, Lithuania (where he had an appointment as a Fulbright Professor of American Studies from 1995 to 1996).

Since returning from the Baltics, Rees has taught at the University of California, Santa Cruz; the University of California, Berkeley; and at Graduate Theological Union (GTU) in Berkeley where he is currently a visiting professor of religion and director of Mormon studies. He has also taught at the University of Wisconsin, Pepperdine, and California State University at both Los Angeles and Northridge. In addition, he has been a visiting scholar at the Center for Arts and Humanities at Claremont Graduate University (1994–95) and currently is a fellow at the Center for Advanced Research, Aorangi Molana Sanctuary, New Zealand.  Rees has taught thirty-five different courses at the university level—in literature, communications, religion, the arts and humanities.

From 1999 to 2011 Rees served as director of education and humanities at HeartMath, a research and education Institute in the Santa Cruz Mountains. At HeartMath he authored or co-authored a number of studies on the heart-brain connection, emotional regulation and education.

Interfaith, ecclesiastical and humanitarian work
Long active in interfaith work, Rees served as president of the University Religious Conference at UC Santa Cruz and on the Interfaith Councils in Santa Cruz and Marin County. He and his late wife, Ruth, served as education and humanitarian service representatives of the Church of Jesus Christ of Latter-day Saints (Mormon) in the St. Petersburg, Russia, and Baltic States regions (1992–96). From 1986-1992 Rees served as bishop of the Los Angeles Singles' Ward (congregation).

Rees is co-founder and current vice-president of the Liahona Children’s Foundation, a non-profit humanitarian organization that addresses children's malnutrition in the developing world. On behalf of the foundation, he has travelled to Guatemala, Columbia, Peru, the Philippines, Haiti and the South Pacific. Rees was also the founder and a board member of Seima ("Family") a humanitarian service organization in Lithuania and has served on the boards of a number of organizations, including SAFE (Save African Families Enterprise), No Bully,  San Jose State University's  Center for Reaching and Teaching the Whole Child, Dialogue: A Journal of Mormon Thought, the Sunstone Foundation, the Claremont Mormon Studies Council and the Bay Area Mormon Studies Council, among others.

Multimedia 
In addition to his scholarly work, Rees wrote, directed and produced Spires to the Sun: Sabatino Rodia's Towers in Watts, a documentary funded by the California Council for the Humanities which had its premier showing on public television station KCET, May 1992, and was also shown on TELE-3, Lithuania, March 1993. He was also producer of The Golden Angel Over the City, a documentary film for Lithuanian State Television. which aired in February 1996.

Rees is the co-author (with Kenny Kemp) of a script entitled "Crucifixion of Innocents: The Life and Death of Dietrich Bonhoeffer," which was optioned by Artemis Films; co-author (with Kenny Kemp) of an original screenplay entitled "A Perfect World"; co-author (with Raphael La Rosa) of a script, "Sabatino Rodia: the Artist Nobody Knows," for KCET Public Television in Los Angeles; executive producer of "I Hear Tell: Storytelling in American Cultures," a projected documentary film on storytelling funded by the National Endowment for the Humanities; designer, writer, and editor of a tele-course on the American Short Story, produced by Coastline Community College; and advisor on the award-winning film, "Families Are Forever," produced by the Family Acceptance Project, San Francisco State University. Currently he is co-writing (with Bob Devan Jones) a musical, "Clarissa and the American Dream" and a play on Ezra Pound (with Clifton Jolley).

Writing and publications 
Rees writes on a variety of subjects—literature, the arts, religion, Mormonism, culture, politics, education, humanitarian issues, feminism, LGBT issues, war and peace and social justice—and in a variety of genres—scholarly articles, personal essays, editorials, poetry, drama, film, reviews, midrash and blogs. He writes regularly for The Huffington Post, Sunstone Magazine (where he has a column called "The Carpenter's Union: Jesus in the Modern World"), and Dialogue. Many of his articles, essays and poems can be found at robert-rees.org.
In addition to numerous articles, essays, poems, editorials, chapters, and reviews, Rees is the author, co-author, editor or co-editor of the following: 
 Waiting for Morning: The Poetry of Robert A. Rees (Zarahemla Press, 2017); 
 Proving Contraries: A Collection of Writings in Honor of Eugene England (Signature Books, 2005); 
 Why I Stay: The Challenges of Discipleship for Contemporary Mormons, ( Signature Books, 2011); 
 The Reader's Book of Mormon  (Signature Books, 2008); 
 Supportive Families, Healthy Children: Helping Lattere-day Saint Families with Lesbian, Gay, Bi-sexual & Transgender Children (San Francisco State University, 2012);
 The College De-Stress Handbook (a handbook for emotional self-management for college students), (HeartMath, 2011); 
 Reducing Test Anxiety and Improving Test Performance in America's Schools: Results from the TestEdge National Demonstration Study (HeartMath, 2007);
 Fifteen American Authors Before 1900: Bibliographic Essays on Research and Criticism (University of Wisconsin Press, 1971, 1984); 
 Guide to the American Short Story (Coast Community College, 1982); 
 Washington Irving's The Adventures of Captain Bonneville, (Twayne, 1977); 
 The Short Story: An Introductory Anthology (Little Brown, 1969, 1975); 
 The Emerson Society Quarterly: Index of the First Decade (Transcendental Books, 1966); 
 A Checklist of Emerson Criticism (19511961) (Transcendental Books, 1963); 
 A Guide for Latter-day Saint Families Dealing with Homosexual Attraction (Deseret Books, 2002); 
 The Persistence of Same-Sex Attraction in Latter-day Saints Who Undergo Counseling or Change Therapy  (Resources for Understanding Homosexuality, 2004); 
 No More Strangers and Foreigners: A Mormon Christian Response to Homosexuality (Family Fellowship, 1998); trans. Into Spanish by Hugo Olaiz, "El Amor y la Imaginación Cristiana"; Requiem for A Gay Mormon (Family Fellowship, 2007)

Honors, awards and fellowshiups 
 Woodrow Wilson National Fellowship, 1960; 
 Danforth Foundation Fellowship finalist, 1960; 
 Danforth Foundation Associate, 19681978; Faculty Fellowship, UCLA, 196667; 
 Humanities Institute, University of California, 196869; 
 Allies Award, Affirmation: Gay and Lesbian Mormons, 2012. 
 Rees has won three awards in the personal essay from the Eugene England Foundation and two awards in poetry from the Association of Mormon Letters.

Works 
 Curriculum Vitae
 Essays
 Poetry
 Editorials

References

Sources
 
  Official Graduate Theological Union page
 Short bio of Rees
 Neal A. Maxwell Institute listing of works by Rees
 Biographical blurb with article in ''Mormon Studies Review" Vol. 2 (2015).

1935 births
20th-century Mormon missionaries
American leaders of the Church of Jesus Christ of Latter-day Saints
Brigham Young University alumni
Living people
Mormon missionaries in Lithuania
American Mormon missionaries in Russia
Mormon studies scholars
Writers from Los Angeles
University of California, Los Angeles faculty
University of Wisconsin–Madison alumni
American expatriates in Lithuania
Academic staff of Vytautas Magnus University
Latter Day Saints from Colorado
Latter Day Saints from California